"Dollhouse" is the debut single by American recording artist Melanie Martinez. The song was featured on Martinez's debut EP of the same name (2014), where it was released as the EP's lead single on February 9, 2014. "Dollhouse" was later featured on Martinez's debut studio album, Cry Baby (2015) as the lead single. Lyrically, "Dollhouse" is about a dysfunctional family, who, according to Martinez, is "hiding being a perfect plastic facade". Martinez has also stated that "Dollhouse" is a metaphor for how people view celebrities and their seemingly perfect public lives. Dollhouse is also the second song of Cry Baby, and this song is also the first official song Martinez wrote.

The song was featured in a preview for the ABC Family series Pretty Little Liars.

Background and composition 
"Dollhouse" was revealed to be a prequel to "Sippy Cup", another single from the “Cry Baby” album that is about an alcoholic mother who decides to kill her husband and his mistress, sparing only her daughter.

Lyrically, according to Martinez, the song discusses a dysfunctional family that is "hiding being a perfect facade", while also serving as a double entendre "for how people view celebrities" and their seemingly perfect public lives.

Music video
The music video for the song was directed by Nathan Scialom & Tom McNamara and uploaded on Martinez's YouTube channel on February 9, 2014. The video starts with a little girl playing with her dolls in a dollhouse. A visible doll is one that has makeup that is made to look like Martinez, who is playing the character Cry Baby in the video. The girl leaves the dollhouse, and the camera gives a closeup as the song starts. It then zooms in on Cry Baby, who is inside of the dollhouse. She sheds the light on her dysfunctional family, explaining that her father is out cheating on her mother, while her brother is smoking marijuana, as the camera pans over her mother who is passed out on the couch holding a wine bottle.

The video then shows the family dressing up so they can look perfect in public and put on the facade of being a perfect family. After this the camera shows the family sitting on the couch, watching TV. Cry Baby describes that, to the outer world, while her mother may seem perfect, she is far from it, as when her husband is out cheating on her with another woman, she drinks away her sorrows. Cry Baby then notices that the girl is coming back upstairs, and warns the other dolls to go back into the places they were in before. They do, and as the girl approaches, Cry Baby stands up. The girl smiles at her, but then Cry Baby tells the girl that her family isn't as perfect as they let on, and she turns the girl into a doll. The rest of the family begins to corner the girl, and as they approach her the girl is turned back into a human. She runs away, and the dollhouse wall closes.

Track listing

Certifications

Release history

References

2014 debut singles
2014 songs
Atlantic Records singles
Melanie Martinez songs
Songs written by Kinetics (rapper)
Songs written by Melanie Martinez
Songs about families
Songs about alcohol